Omiodes ochracea is a moth in the family Crambidae. It was described by Patricia Gentili-Poole and Maria Alma Solis in 1998. It is found in Costa Rica.

References

Moths described in 1998
ochracea